The following is a partial list of notable Utah State University faculty, past and present. Utah State University is located in Logan, Utah, and currently employs more than 800 faculty in seven colleges and schools. This list does not contain the names of presidents or alumni of the university, unless they also happen to fall into the faculty category.

Notable faculty and staff

Leon Anderson, Professor Emeritus of Sociology
Leonard J. Arrington, "father of Mormon history"
Michael Ballam, tenor
Philip Barlow, world's first full-time professor of Mormon studies at a secular university
Ken Brewer, poet
George Dewey Clyde, Governor of Utah
Christopher Cokinos, poet and nonfiction writer
Richard P. Condie, Grammy-winning former director of the Mormon Tabernacle Choir
Stephen R. Covey, management scholar and author
Spencer Cox, Governor of Utah
Hugo de Garis, artificial intelligence researcher
Lee Frischknecht, former president of National Public Radio
Fry Street Quartet, musicians
Maura Hagan, physicist, member of the National Academy of Sciences
Craig Jessop, former director of the Mormon Tabernacle Choir
Don L. Lind, NASA astronaut; member of "The Original 19"
Stew Morrill, former head men's basketball coach; over 500 wins in 23 seasons
David Peak, physicist; mentored 1 Rhodes and 7 Goldwater Scholars; Utah Carnegie Professor of the Year
Donald W. Roberts, Research Professor Emeritus, Department of Biology
Alexa Sand, art historian
Joseph Tainter, anthropologist and historian
John A. Widtsoe, former member of the Quorum of Twelve Apostles of the LDS Church

References

 
Utah State University faculty
USU people